Ornithion is a genus of birds in the large tyrant flycatcher family Tyrannidae.

Species
The genus contains three species:

References

External links

 
Bird genera
Taxonomy articles created by Polbot